The Turks in Tunisia, also known as Turco-Tunisians and Tunisian Turks, are ethnic Turks who constitute one of the minority groups in Tunisia. 

In 1534, with about 10,000 Turkish soldiers, the Ottoman Empire took control and settled in the region when Tunisia's inhabitants called for help due to fears that the Spanish would invade the country.  Thus, during the Ottoman rule, the Turkish community dominated the political life of the region for centuries; as a result, the ethnic mix of Tunisia changed considerably with the continuous migration of Turks from Anatolia, as well as other parts of the Ottoman territories, for over 300 years. In addition, some Turks intermarried with the local population and their male offspring were called "Kouloughlis". Consequently, the terms "Turks" and "Kouloughlis" have traditionally been used to distinguish between those of full and partial Turkish ancestry.  

In northern Cap Bon, the town of Hammam Ghezèze ( "Oghuz's bath") is populated with descendants of Oghuz Turks (Ghezèze and Aghzaz being Arabic for "Oghuz").

Demographics
Families of Turkish origin live mainly near the coastal cities, such as Tunis, Mahdia, Hammamet and the islands (such as Djerba), although there are also many living within central Tunisia as well.

Culture

Language
In 2012 the Tunisian government introduced the Turkish language in all Tunisian secondary schools.

Religion
The Ottoman Turks brought with them the teaching of the Hanafi School of Islam during the Ottoman rule of Tunisia, which still survives among the Turkish-descended families today. Traditionally, Turco-Tunisian mosques have octagonal minarets. Examples of Ottoman-Turkish mosques include:

Notable people

 
The Turks in Tunisia were traditionally a privileged élite in Tunisia who held positions in the military and the bureaucracy. However, by the nineteenth century, marriages with the local population linked the ruling families to indigenous notables. At this time, many Turks also turned to commerce and the crafts, initially in the Souq el-Trouk (the Bazaar of the Turks), where a considerable number of merchants of Turkish ancestry emerged. The Turks also entered the corps of artisans. The Ben Romdhan family, of Turkish origin, claim much of the notable Tunisian families of Mahdia such as the Hamza, Turki, Gazdagli, Agha, and Snène families.

Ahmed Abdelkefi, economist
, historian 
Mahmoud Aslan, writer
, politician 
Al-Husayn I ibn Ali at-Turki, founder of the Husainid Dynasty
Mohamed Salah Baratli, resistant of the French occupation, opponent of President Bourguiba, human rights activist
, religious cleric 
, religious cleric 
, intellectual 
, religious cleric
, religious cleric
Asma Belkhodja, pioneer of the Tunisian feminist movement
, politician
Ali Bach Hamba, journalist and politician
Mohamed Bach Hamba, writer 
Mahmoud Ben Mahmoud, filmmaker
Yasemin Besson, wife of Éric Besson 
Lotfi Bouchnak, musician
Hassen Bouhajeb, doctor
, journalist
Ahmed Chérif, doctor
, doctor 
Mustapha Dinguizli, politician
Ali Douagi, literary and cultural icon
Abderrahman Dziri, medical researcher
Mustafa Elkatipzade, Fenerbahçe football manager
Nazli Fadhel, pioneer of the Tunisian feminist movement
Sadok Ghileb, politician
, theatre director
Afef Jnifen, model and actress
Mohamed Lahbib, pioneer of theater and television in Tunisia
Mahmoud El Materi, physician and politician
Moncef El Materi, former soldier and businessman
Sakher El Materi, businessman
Tahar El Materi, businessman
, photographer 
, artist 
Chafia Rochdi, singer and actress
Hichem Rostom, actor 
Mourad Salem, artist
Rachid Sfar, former prime minister
Mongi Slim, nationalist leader and Minister
, diplomat
Najiya Thamir, writer and radio producer
Hedi Turki, painter
Yahia Turki, painter
Zoubeir Turki, painter
Abdeljelil Zaouche, Minister of Justice (1936–1943)
, professor

See also
Kouloughlis
History of Ottoman-era Tunisia
Tunisia-Turkey relations
Turkish minorities in the former Ottoman Empire
Turks in the Arab world
Turks in Algeria
Turks in Libya

References

Bibliography 
 
 
 
.
.
 
.
.
.
.
.
 
.
.
.
 
.
 
 

Ethnic groups in Tunisia
Tunisia
 
Tunisia